Moon of the Crusted Snow is a 2018 post-apocalyptic thriller novel by Waubgeshig Rice. Set in a rural Anishinaabe community in northern Canada, it follows a group of community members after they are cut off from the rest of the world amidst a societal collapse. A sequel, Moon of the Turning Leaves, has been announced for 2023. The novel was nominated for the 2019 John W. Campbell Memorial Award for Best Science Fiction Novel.

Plot

Evan Whitesky and his wife Nicole raise their two children on an Anishinaabe reservation in northern Canada. The reservation loses power and all connection to the outside world, though the town’s generators are able to power essential services through the winter. Two college students return from the south, bringing stories of societal collapse. A white man named Justin Scott arrives on the reservation, seeking shelter from the chaos. The chief and council allow him to stay, though they do not trust him.

The council institutes food and electricity rationing. Two young women freeze to death after drinking with Scott. Another group of white people arrive at the reservation begging for food, and Scott shoots one of them. As conditions deteriorate, Scott’s influence increases and the band council’s diminishes. There is a riot at the food handout line, and Scott suggests that he has found an alternative food source. A body goes missing from the morgue; Evan suspects Scott of cannibalism. He and other community leaders confront Scott, who is cooking the body into a stew. Scott is shot and killed; Evan is shot, but he survives.

In an epilogue two years later, the power has never returned and the community is returning to their ancestral way of life. They leave the reservation for a new settlement.

Major themes

Alicia Elliot of the CBC writes that many non-Indigenous horror novelists use "old Indian burial grounds" as an explanation for why white protagonists are haunted. They may also use plot devices such as viruses wiping out entire populations, which have actually happened to Native American populations. In contrast, Moon of the Crusted Snow begins when the power goes out and the community is cut off from the wider world. At first, the community does not recognize the gravity of the situation, since their phone and Internet connections are frequently disrupted. As more community members die, the protagonist Evan notes that northern communities such as the one in the novel are "familiar with tragedy". According to Elliot, this serves as a magnification of "generations of intergenerational trauma and genocide".

The Literary Review of Canada wrote that the novel explores a "doubled apocalypse": the fictional breakdown of society is contrasted to the real historical and cultural genocide against the Anishinaabe and other First Nations Peoples. Justin, a white man, eventually cannibalizes a Native American corpse, serving as a metaphor for cultural genocide.

In a review for Strange Horizons, Sean Guynes explored the concept of Anishinaabe "separation" from the "white world". Guynes wrote that the character of Scott and his appearance on the reservation underscored the band's separation from white Canada; Scott has a "fetish" for Indigenous women and misuses Anishinaabemowin words. The elder Aileen explains that the Anishinaabe were not originally an arctic people. They were driven from their ancestral lands by men similar to Scott. The band's reliance on white-owned convenience stores and white-owned power plants is a symptom of this earlier genocide. Additionally, Evan and Nicole have traditionally white names as a result of white influence on native names, language, and culture. Their children Maiingan and Nangohns have traditional Anishinaabemowin names, which indicates a return to a more traditional way of life.

Style

The Anishinaabe language appears frequently in the novel. The words are sometimes defined and sometimes only understood through context. There is no glossary or pronunciation guide. This reflects an intentional choice by the author, who wanted readers to "do [work] on their own" as a "part of active learning".

Rice uses jump cuts in which time passes without explicit description, similar to the works of James Joyce.

Katharine Coldiron compared the novel's tight focus to the style of Alas, Babylon by Pat Frank. Both novels describe the "eye-level" view of people reacting to a disaster.

Background

Rice stated in an interview with the Toronto Star that he had always been intrigued by post-apocalyptic stories such as The Lord of the Flies and The Chrysalids. After reading The Road, he wondered if he could put "an Indigenous lens" on that type of story.

Reception and Awards

Moon of the Crusted Snow received praise from critics. Katharine Coldiron of Locus praised the novel's "slow, deliberate" prose, calling it a "humble but welcome addition" to the postapocalyptic genre. Publishers Weekly called the book a "powerful story of survival [that] will leave readers breathless". The Seattle Book Review gave the novel five out of five possible stars, calling it a "frighteningly plausible" story that "shouldn't be missed".

The book saw a resurgence in interest after the COVID-19 pandemic. When one Quebec couple traveled thousands of miles to the community of Old Crow, Yukon in an attempt to avoid COVID-19, many users on Twitter compared the story to a plot point from the novel.

In 2019, Moon of the Crusted Snow received the Evergreen Award, which invites people to read and vote on a selection of Canadian books curated by librarians. It was nominated for the 2019 John Campbell Award. In 2020, the novel was selected as Hamilton, Ontario's "must-read book" of the year.

References

2018 Canadian novels
Books about Native Americans
Post-apocalyptic novels
ECW Press books